Kohistan Football Club Herat Is a football club based in Herat City of Afghanistan which plays in Herat Premier League

History

Primera Liga debut

Club colours
The club kit color is Golden color which is known as Talahi Poshane kohistan.

Honours

Domestic

References

Football clubs in Afghanistan